Brookfield Corporation is a Canadian multinational company that is one of the world's largest alternative investment management companies, with over US$725 billion of assets under management in 2022. It focuses on direct control investments in real estate, renewable power, infrastructure, credit and private equity. The company invests in distressed securities through Oaktree Capital, which it bought in 2019. Brookfield's headquarters are in Toronto. It also has corporate offices in New York City, London, São Paulo, Mumbai, Shanghai, Dubai, and Sydney.

History

The company was founded in 1899 as the São Paulo Tramway, Light and Power Company by William Mackenzie and Frederick Stark Pearson. It operated in the construction and management of electricity and transport infrastructure in Brazil.

In 1904, the Rio de Janeiro Tramway, Light and Power Company was founded by Mackenzie's group.

In 1912, Brazilian Traction, Light and Power Company was incorporated in Toronto as a public company to develop hydro-electric power operations and other utility services in Brazil, becoming a holding company for São Paulo Tramway Co. and Rio de Janeiro Tramway Co. In 1916, Great Lakes Power Company was incorporated to provide hydro-electric power in Sault Ste. Marie and the Algoma District in Ontario.

In 1959, Edper Investments, founded by brothers Peter and Edward Bronfman, acquired Brazilian Traction, Light and Power Company for $15 million. In 1966, Brazilian Traction, Light and Power Company changed its name to Brazilian Light and Power Company, and again in 1969, changed its name to Brascan Limited. Brascan is a portmanteau of "Brasil" and "Canada".

During the 1970s, the company began to sell its Brazilian interests, and invested more heavily in industries such as a real estate, timber and mining.

In 1979, the last of the company's Brazilian assets were transferred to Brazilian ownership (Eletropaulo and Light S.A.), the company meanwhile having diversified to other areas. The company provided electricity and tram services in São Paulo and Rio de Janeiro. After a restructuring, the company's Brazilian portfolio operated as Light S.A., short for Brazilian Traction, Light and Power Co. Ltd.

In 2002, Bruce Flatt was appointed CEO of Brascan. In 2005, after 37 years, Brascan Corp. was renamed to Brookfield Asset Management Inc. Between 2013 and 2018, the company and its subsidiaries invested approximately $10 billion in Brazilian energy, infrastructure and real estate developments, including acquisitions of oil pipelines from energy companies such as Petroleo Brasileiro SA.

In 1992, Brookfield and Johnson Controls was established through a merger in Canada of Brookfield and Johnson Controlsa building systems and facility management company that was founded in the late 19th century by Warren S. Johnson, whose invention of the first electric room thermostat helped launch the building control industry. By 2012, Brookfield and Johnson Controls became an established industry leader with 11,500 locations across Canada. In 2007, Brookfield Asset Management acquired the Multiplex, an Australian international construction contracting company founded in 1962 by John Roberts. which was valued at that time at approximately A$7.3 billion. It was renamed Brookfield Multiplex in 2016. In 2012 Brookfield Asset Management and Johnson Controls Global WorkPlace Solutions (GWS) merged to create Brookfield Johnson Controls.

In 2015, Brookfield Asset Management became the ultimate parent company of what is now Brookfield Global Integrated Solutions (BGIS), when it acquired control of Brookfield Johnson Controls from its joint venture partner, Milwaukee-based Johnson Controls. At that time, an activist investor had been putting pressure on Johnson Controls to divest of its real estate division. The facilities management business was renamed Brookfield Global Integrated Solutions (BGIS) as part of Brookfield's plan to establish a "leading global facilities management provider". BGIS expanded rapidly following Brookfield's taking control of BGIS in 2015,  In 2016, when BGIS acquired the US-based data centre facility management serviceMcKinstry FMSwhich had over "350 engineers, technicians, planners and program managers", BGIS became one of the largest facility management companies serving date centres in North America. By 2017, when Gord Hicks was named as Toronto-based BGIS' CEO, the company had 7,000 staff members and 100 clients in the United States, the United Kingdom, Asia, and Canada, which included contracts with the Canadian federal government. By 2022, according to a Carleton University School of Public Policy and Administration analysis of federal government contracts for real estate management, the Government of Canada spent over $1 billion on contracts with BGIS in 2021-2022, representing the largest vendor contracts at that time. The vendor with the second largest federal government contracts in 2021-2022 was IBM Canada with a contract valued at c. 476 million. In 2019 Brookfield Asset Management sold its BGIS shares to CCMP Capital Advisorsan American private equity investment firmfor over  CAD$1.3 billion with Hicks remaining as CEO. and was awarded the 2020 Private Equity Deal of the Year for the BGIS sale.

By 2018, Brookfield's major public subsidiaries included Brookfield Infrastructure Partners, Brookfield Renewable Partners, Brookfield Property Partners, and Brookfield Business Partners. In August 2018, Brookfield purchased Westinghouse Electric Company, a manufacturer of large nuclear reactors, out of bankruptcy for $4.6 billion.

On March 13, 2019, Brookfield Asset Management announced that it had agreed to buy most of Oaktree Capital Management for about $4.7 billion, creating one of the world's largest alternative money managers.  On July 31, 2019, the sale of Vodafone New Zealand Limited to a consortium comprising Infratil Limited and Brookfield Asset Management Inc. was settled.

In a deal in October 2019, Brookfield bought The Leela Palaces, Hotels and Resorts, an Indian luxury hotel chain located in New Delhi, Bengaluru, Chennai, Udaipur, in a US$530 million settlement, marking the entry of Brookfield in India's hospitality market.

In 2020, in response to the COVID-19 pandemic, Brookfield's CEO Bruce Flatt assessed that the economic fallout was "much more manageable" than previous meltdowns.

In October 2020, Mark Carney, departing Governor of the Bank of England, became a vice-chair of Brookfield, leading the firm's environmental, social and governance (ESG) and impact fund investment strategy.

On April 25, 2022, it was announced the Brookfield and Simon Property Group were set to offer to buy Kohl's.

In August 2022, Intel signed a $30billion partnership with Brookfield to fund its recent factory expansions. As part of the deal, Intel would have a controlling stake by funding 51% of the cost of building new chip-making facilities in Chandler, Arizona, with Brookfield owning the remaining 49% stake, allowing the companies to split the revenue from those facilities.

On December 9, 2022, the company's name was changed from Brookfield Asset Management Inc. to Brookfield Corporation. Brookfield Corporation then spun-off 25% interest in their asset management business into the new publically listed Brookfield Asset Management Ltd.

Reactions and lawsuits 

In September 2010, a group called Birch Mountain Shareholders for Justice filed a lawsuit with the Ontario Superior Court of Justice against Brookfield Asset Management, challenging an acquisition and transfer of assets. Birch Mountain had run into financial troubles and accused Brookfield of financial engineering that resulted in Brookfield acquiring the company's $1.6 billion limestone quarry for $50 million. According to Birch Mountain, Brookfield had made use of death spiral financing and insider trading. After five years of litigation the case was dismissed, based on the fact that Birch Mountain had failed to present credible evidence. In May 2015, the plaintiffs filed a notice of appeal, but their case was likewise dismissed two years later.

In 2009, Brookfield sued financial and insurance giant American International Group (AIG) in a Manhattan federal court, alleging that AIG's collapse caused default provisions in interest-rate swaps. The suit stemmed from AIG's acceptance of a $182.3 billion bailout package from the federal government, which Brookfield argued overturned AIG's bankruptcy protection. The insurance firm countersued, claiming that Brookfield was trying to get out of its $1.5 billion debt to AIG. The litigation ended with Brookfield paying $905 million to settle the lawsuit.

In March 2013, the Southern Investigative Reporting Foundation called into question Brookfield's makeup. The analysis written by Roddy Boyd accused the company of using a pyramidal control structure, alleging that a small group of shareholders hold outsized power and may easily utilize the capital of other investors without risking their own.

In 2013, a Brazilian prosecutor filed charges against the company's local division, alleging the company paid bribes to local officials, which is also a violation of U.S. federal criminal law. The bribes were allegedly used to pave the way for Brookfield to build a shopping center in São Paulo. The U.S. Securities and Exchange Commission also opened a formal investigation into the company about the bribery charges. The company denied the charges. The U.S. Department of Justice also opened a criminal investigation into the company regarding these allegations, and did not end up making any arrests. According to the Stanford Law School Foreign Corrupt Practices Act Clearinghouse, which studied the case, the investigation and filing of charges was initiated by a whistleblower and anonymous tip. Later it was revealed that the whistleblower was the former CFO of a Brookfield subsidiary. She claims she was fired for refusing to participate in Brookfield's bribery scheme. The company disclosed the investigations on several 6-K forms between 2013 and 2015.

In August 2018, Brookfield signed a 99-year lease on the financially troubled 666 Fifth Avenue skyscraper, of Donald Trump's son in law Jared Kushner. The deal raised suspicions that the Qatar Investment Authority, a major investor in Brookfield, was attempting to influence the Trump administration.

In November 2020, it was revealed that Brookfield might be partnering with telecommunications giant Rogers Communications to introduce condominiums to the site of the Rogers Centre, halving the space available for sport. The original multi-purpose stadium and its land cost $570 million, significantly funded by taxpayers, yet was sold 15 years later to Rogers for just $25 million.

In February 2021, Mark Carney, Vice Chairman and Head of Impact Investing and ex Governor of the Bank of England, had to retract an earlier claim that the $600 billion Brookfield Asset Management portfolio was carbon neutral. He based his claim on the fact that Brookfield has a large renewable energy portfolio and "all the avoided emissions that come with that". The claim was criticized as an accounting trick, as avoided emissions do not counteract the emissions from investments in coal and other fossil fuels responsible for a carbon footprint of about 5,200 metric tons of carbon dioxide. The company is actually aiming to be net-zero by 2050, which is decades behind leading companies.

Finances 

For the fiscal year 2018, Brookfield Asset Management reported earnings of US$3.584 billion, with an annual revenue of $56.771 billion, an increase of 39.2% over the previous fiscal cycle. Brookfield Asset Management's shares traded at over $38 per share, and its market capitalization was valued at over $40.8 billion in November 2018.

See also
Edper Investments, the Bronfman holding company that controlled Brascan from 1979 to 1993
List of real estate companies of Canada

References

External links

 
Financial services companies established in 1899
Companies listed on the Toronto Stock Exchange
S&P/TSX 60
Companies based in Toronto
Multinational companies headquartered in Canada
Real estate companies of Canada